Welfia is a genus of palms found in Central America (Panama, Costa Rica, Honduras, Nicaragua) and northwestern South America (Colombia, Ecuador, Peru). Only two species are currently recognized: Welfia regia and Welfia alfredii.

References

Geonomateae
Flora of Central America
Flora of South America
Arecaceae genera